Gigolos on Parole is Nasty Idols' debut album release. This is the only release that the band openly discredits as they don't feel it represents the band at all. It is seen as a fan only release; one for collectors.

Track listing

Singles
"Don't Walk From Love/Easy Come Easy Go" (1988)

Personnel
 Andy Pierce - Vocals
 Jonnie Wee - Lead Guitar
 Dick Qwarfort - Bass
 George Swanson - Drums
 Roger White - Keyboards

References

1989 debut albums
Nasty Idols albums